Rugby sevens at the 2011 Pacific Games was held from August 31–September 2, 2011 at several venues.

Events

Medal table

Medal summary

See also
 Rugby sevens at the Pacific Games

References
Rugby sevens at the 2011 Pacific Games

 
2011 Pacific Games
2011
rugby union
2011 in Oceanian rugby union
2011 rugby sevens competitions
International rugby union competitions hosted by New Caledonia